The Fichtenohe is a river of Bavaria, Germany. It flows into the Pegnitz in the town Pegnitz. It is also considered the upper course of the Pegnitz.

See also
List of rivers of Bavaria

References

Rivers of Bavaria
Bayreuth (district)
Rivers of Germany